Antecerococcus is a genus of scale insects. They are found worldwide but with greater abundance in the Old World. There are about 56 species:

 Antecerococcus albospicatus 
 Antecerococcus alluaudi 
 Antecerococcus andamanensis  Hodgson & Williams, 2016
 Antecerococcus ankaratrae (Mamet, 1954) 
 Antecerococcus asparagi (Joubert, 1925) 
 Antecerococcus baccharidis  (Hempel, 1900) 
 Antecerococcus badius (Leonardi, 1911)
 Antecerococcus bryoides (Maskell, 1894)
 Antecerococcus camarai  (Neves, 1954) 
 Antecerococcus capensis Hodgson & Williams, 2016
 Antecerococcus cistarum (Balachowsky, 1927)
 Antecerococcus citri (Lambdin, 1986) 
 Antecerococcus cliffortiae (Joubert, 1925) 
 Antecerococcus corokiae (Maskell, 1890) 
 Antecerococcus delottoi  Hodgson & Williams, 2016
 Antecerococcus dumonti  (Vayssière, 1927) 
 Antecerococcus echinatus (Wang & Qiu, 1986)
 Antecerococcus eremobius (Scott, 1907) 
 Antecerococcus fradei (Castel-Branco, 1952) 
 Antecerococcus froggatti  (Morrison & Morrison, 1927) 
 Antecerococcus gabonensis  (Lambdin, 1983) 
 Antecerococcus gallicolus  (Mamet, 1959) 
 Antecerococcus hilli Hodgson & Williams, 2016
 Antecerococcus indicus (Maskell, 1897) 
 Antecerococcus insleyae Hodgson & Williams, 2016 
 Antecerococcus intermedius (Balachowsky, 1930) 
 Antecerococcus kakamegae Hodgson & Williams, 2016
 Antecerococcus keralae Hodgson & Williams, 2016 
 Antecerococcus kurraensis Hodgson & Williams, 2016
 Antecerococcus laniger (Goux, 1932) 
 Antecerococcus lizeri (Granara de Willink, 1996)
 Antecerococcus longipilosus  (Archangelskaya, 1930) 
 Antecerococcus madagascariensis  (Mamet, 1959) 
 Antecerococcus mirandae (Lambdin, 1987) 
 Antecerococcus muntingi Hodgson & Williams, 2016
 Antecerococcus oranensis (Balachowsky, 1941) 
 Antecerococcus ornatus (Green, 1909) 
 Antecerococcus oumeensis Hodgson & Williams, 2016
 Antecerococcus ovoides (Cockerell, 1901)
 Antecerococcus paradoxus (Maskell, 1889) 
 Antecerococcus parahybensis (Hempel, 1927) 
 Antecerococcus passerinae (Brain, 1920) 
 Antecerococcus perowskiae (Archangelskaya, 1931) 
 Antecerococcus philippiae  (Lambdin & Kosztarab, 1977) 
 Antecerococcus pileae (Mamet, 1950) 
 Antecerococcus pocilliferus  (Neves, 1954) 
 Antecerococcus roseus (Green, 1909)
 Antecerococcus royenae  (Brain, 1920) 
 Antecerococcus ruber (Balachowsky, 1930) 
 Antecerococcus sparsiporus  Hodgson & Williams, 2016 
 Antecerococcus stellatus  (Maskell, 1897) 
 Antecerococcus steppicus (Balachowsky, 1941) 
 Antecerococcus thesii Hodgson & Williams, 2016
 Antecerococcus theydoni (Hall, 1935) 
 Antecerococcus yemenicus Hodgson & Williams, 2016
 Antecerococcus zapotlanus (Cockerell, 1903)

References

External links 
 Scalenet

Scale insects
Hemiptera genera